Adrian Johnston (born 1961) is an English musician and composer for film and television, who resides in London and Samois-sur-Seine.

Biography 
Born in the county of Lancashire, Johnston attended the University of Edinburgh, studying English. He has been a drummer in bands including Moles for Breakfast, The Waterboys, the Wanglers, Combo Zombo, and The Mike Flowers Pops. During his twenties, he travelled the world providing music accompaniment to silent films at film festivals. He later scored productions for the Royal National Theatre and the Royal Shakespeare Company.

Johnston's first film score was for the 1996 Thomas Hardy adaptation Jude. He has also composed original scores for Becoming Jane, a 2007 film about Jane Austen, and the 2008 adaptation of Evelyn Waugh's Brideshead Revisited. In 2008, he was awarded a BAFTA for the score of the BBC film Capturing Mary.

Johnston's score for Charles Sturridge's mini-series Shackleton won a 2002 Primetime Emmy. In 2009, he scored the British science-fiction procedural TV series Paradox. He composed the theme music for the BBC detective series Zen, which won him a 2011 RTS Awards; the World War II drama The Sinking of the Laconia; Stephen Poliakoff's acclaimed 2013 TV series Dancing on the Edge; and the drama The 7.39. Johnston won another RTS award in 2014 for scoring The Tunnel.

References

External links

1961 births
Living people
English rock drummers
British male drummers
English composers
English film score composers
English male film score composers
English television composers
Alumni of the University of Edinburgh
BAFTA winners (people)
Emmy Award winners